Year 1321 (MCCCXXI) was a common year starting on Thursday (link will display the full calendar) of the Julian calendar.

Events

January–December 
c. May–June – Leper scare: Rumours that lepers (acting on the orders of Jews bribed by Moors) are attempting to poison the Christian population spread throughout southern France.
 August 14 – King Edward II of England reluctantly agrees to demands from his barons to send Hugh le Despenser, 1st Earl of Winchester, and his son Hugh Despenser the Younger into exile. 
 October 29 – King Stephen Uroš II Milutin of Serbia dies. His son Stephen Constantine claims the throne, but Constantine's younger half-brother Stephen Uroš III Dečanski succeeds.

Date unknown 
 The Byzantine civil war of 1321–28 begins, when Andronikos III Palaiologos initiates an uprising against Andronikos II Palaiologos.
 A bad harvest brings famine in Europe.
 The Anatolian beylik of Teke is established.
 Gračanica monastery in Kosovo is rebuilt by the Serbian king Stefan Milutin.
 Spitakavor Monastery is completed in Armenia.
 The University of Florence is established.
The Kebra Negast is translated from Arabic to Ge'ez, according to its colophon.

Births 
 February 5 – John II, Marquess of Montferrat (d. 1372)
 July 5 – Joan of The Tower, queen consort of Scotland (d. 1362)
 August 29 – John of Artois, Count of Eu, French soldier (d. 1387)
 date unknown
 James I, Count of Urgell
 Khwaja Bande Nawaz, Sufi saint (d. 1422)
 probable – Emperor John III of Trebizond (d. 1362)

Deaths 
 January 12 or 1322 – Maria of Brabant, queen consort of Philip III of France (b. 1256)
 January 13 – Bonacossa Borri, Lady of Milan (b. 1254)
 February 25 – Beatrice d'Avesnes, consort of Henry VI, Count of Luxembourg
 March 18 – Matthew III Csák, Hungarian oligarch (b. c.1260/5)
 April 8 – Thomas of Tolentino, Italian Franciscan missionary, martyred (b. c. 1255)
 April 17 – Infanta Blanche of Portugal, daughter of King Afonso III of Portugal and Urraca of Castile (b. 1259)
 April 27 – Nicolò Albertini, Italian cardinal statesman (b. c. 1250)
 May 31 – Birger, King of Sweden (b. 1280)
 July 1 – María de Molina, queen consort of Castile (b. c. 1265)
 September 14 – Dante Alighieri, Italian poet (b. 1265)
 October 29 – Stefan Milutin, King of Serbia (b. c. 1253)
 November 9 – Walter Langton, bishop of Lichfield and treasurer of England (b. 1243)

 date unknown
 Marianus III of Arborea, Giudice
 Mubarak Khan, Khilji regent, murdered
 Reginald of Burgundy, Count of Montbéliard
 Witte van Haemstede, Dutch prince (b. 1280/2)
 probable – Ibn al-Banna' al-Marrakushi, Arab mathematician (b. 1256)

See also
 List of state leaders in 1321
 1321 in Scotland

References